Graham Henry Symonds (21 March 1937 – 2 June 2006) was an English swimmer.

Swimming career
He represented Great Britain in the Olympics and European championships. Symonds won a bronze medal in the 200 m butterfly at the 1958 European Aquatics Championships. He competed in the same event at the 1956 Summer Olympics, but did not reach the finals.

He represented England and won a silver medal in the 220 yards butterfly and a bronze medal in the medley relay at the 1958 British Empire and Commonwealth Games in Cardiff, Wales. He won the 1954 ASA National Championship 440 yards freestyle title  and the 220 yards butterfly title in 1955.

Personal life
Symonds was born in Coventry and studied at the Coventry Art School. He was first coached by his father Sid Symonds, a semi-professional football player. After retiring from swimming he worked at the technical publications department of the Armstrong Siddeley's aircraft division. He then designed tractors at Massey Ferguson, worked for Chrysler Rootes, and in 1967 joined Ford. In the 1980s–90s he worked in Dearborn, Michigan, US, designing medium and large trucks, such as Ford Transit. During that time he also competed in masters swimming. He returned to UK in 1998 to assume the post of assistant director of design of small and medium Ford vehicles  at Dunton Wayletts, Essex. He retired in 2002 and died in 2006 in Essex, leaving wife Ina and children Heather, Brett and Andrea and brother Robert Bruce Symonds.

See also
 List of Commonwealth Games medallists in swimming (men)

References

1937 births
2006 deaths
Swimmers at the 1956 Summer Olympics
Olympic swimmers of Great Britain
Male butterfly swimmers
English male swimmers
Sportspeople from Coventry
European Aquatics Championships medalists in swimming
Commonwealth Games medallists in swimming
Commonwealth Games silver medallists for England
Commonwealth Games bronze medallists for England
Swimmers at the 1958 British Empire and Commonwealth Games
Medallists at the 1958 British Empire and Commonwealth Games